"All Through the Night" is a song written and recorded by Jules Shear for his 1983 album Watch Dog. It was produced by Todd Rundgren. 

The song was covered by the rock band the Cars, who did not use it on any of their albums, and by Cyndi Lauper, who included it on her debut album She's So Unusual (1984). Lauper's version peaked at number five on the Billboard Hot 100, becoming her fourth top five single in the U.S. An acoustic version was sung by Lauper on her 2005 album, The Body Acoustic, with additional vocals by Shaggy.

Shear said his own idea was that "All Through the Night" was a folk song, but that Lauper's electronic interpretation was more lucrative, paying for his New York apartment.

Writing and composition
The song was written by Jules Shear for his 1983 debut solo album, Watch Dog. Produced by Todd Rundgren, the song was composed in a medium tempo. Lyrically, "All Through the Night" addresses the concept of love and its tug at heart-strings.

Shear recalled in an interview, "[it's] like a big bonus really. Cyndi Lauper does a song ('All Through the Night') that's on a solo record of mine. I just thought, 'No one's really going to hear this.' Then she does it, and it becomes a Top 5 song." "I'm just glad people know the songs, really. I think they're really good. The only problem is with people who don't know I wrote them. I do them and they think, 'God, he's doing that Cyndi Lauper song'", Shear said later.

Reception
"All Through the Night" received little attention as Watch Dog never charted. Chris Woodstra from AllMusic highlighted the song when he reviewed Watch Dog. Dave DiMartino described it as "boasting". A reviewer from the Philadelphia Inquirer called it a "terribly good [song]".

Cyndi Lauper version 

American singer Cyndi Lauper recorded a version for her 1983 album She's So Unusual. Shear said he was surprised that his "folk song" was interpreted by Lauper as "a drum machine and techno thing". According to Lauper, she wanted it to be just like Shear's version, with a bit more of an acoustic sound. However, she changed her mind, saying that she wanted to remake it in her own style.

Composition

For her cover version, Lauper transposed the key up a minor third to A-flat major, and kept the tempo at the same 96 beats per minute as the original. The song is set in common time. Lauper's voice spans an octave and a fourth between G3 and D♭5. Jules Shear himself makes a guest appearance on Lauper's version, singing a wordless falsetto melody near the end, as well as the lower harmony in the choruses. The chorus was unintentionally altered by Lauper from the Shear version when she heard the upper harmony vocal and thought it was the lead vocal. The song follows up "Time After Time" love and its tug at heart-strings concept.

Critical reception

Reception for her version was mostly positive. Don McLeese of the Chicago Sun-Times said that the song was the one that "showed her impressive range to best advantage."  Cash Box said that "Cyndi Lauper strikes again with a strong vocal performance" and praised the "hypnotic keyboard melody" and "emotion charged harmonies." The Philadelphia Inquirer said that she had a "strong voice" in the song. However, another Philadelphia Inquirer review said that the song was "a not terribly good version of Jules Shear's terribly good [song]." Richard Harrington of The Washington Post believed that it was her most reflective song. Kevin East of Sensible Sound said that the song was "a heavy, melancholy tune." Leslie Gray Streeter of the Palm Beach Post said that the song was "lovely" and "delicate." Even Shear himself was a fan of Lauper's version, saying "The Cyndi Lauper thing where she did 'All Through the Night,' that was great because she did it so differently than the way I did. I liked that, too." However, the St. Petersburg Times did not like the song, saying that it was a "pedestrian filler number" on the album.

Kurt Loder of Rolling Stone said that Lauper "does an almost tasteful reading" of the song. Sal Cinquemani of Slant magazine said that the song emerged as one of "the greatest pop masterpieces of the '80s." Shear said that Lauper's version 
is his all-time favorite cover.

The song was later re-recorded by Lauper, for her album The Body Acoustic, an album in which she recorded acoustic versions of her favorite songs. This version included vocals by Shaggy. Charles Andrews of Audio/Video Revolution said of this version, "Acoustic guitar strumming continues into "All Through the Night" and then – whoa! – who's that toaster? It's Shaggy, ducking in and out with his own rapid-fire lyric take, an inspired bit of casting that turns the romantic ballad on its head." The song is also one of her more popular songs that she performs in live concerts.

Chart performance
"All Through The Night" was released in the United States in September 1984. It debuted on the Billboard Hot 100 at number 49, and reached a peak position of five in its 10th week, becoming Lauper's fourth consecutive top five in the U.S. The song achieved some crossover success, peaking at number four on the Adult Contemporary chart for three weeks, and reaching a peak position of 38 on the Mainstream Rock Chart. "All Through the Night" made Lauper the first female singer to generate four top 10 hits in the Hot 100 from a debut album. The week ending January 19, 1985, while it was moving down the Hot 100, it was the biggest free-faller, falling from #33 to #64. In Canada, the single peaked at number seven on the RPM singles chart in December 1984, and was certified gold by the Music Canada in January 1985.

In the United Kingdom, the song did not perform as well as Lauper's previous releases. It debuted at number 82 on the UK Singles Chart in November 1984, peaking at number 64, staying only six weeks on the chart. The single performed similarly throughout the rest of Europe, peaking at number 16 in Switzerland, and at number 35 in Germany. It was more successful in Austria, where it peaked at number five, becoming her fourth consecutive top five in the country.

Track listing
7" Single
"All Through the Night" – 4:33
"Witness" – 3:40

Credits and personnel
Cyndi Lauper – lead vocals
Jules Shear – backing vocals
Rick Chertoff – producer
Anton Fig – drums
Rob Hyman – keyboards, synthesizers
Lennie Petze – executive producer
Janet Perr – design, cover art concept

Credits adapted from the album liner notes.

Charts

Weekly charts

Year-end charts

Certifications

Other cover versions
Elliot Easton of American rock band the Cars helped produce Shear's version of "All Through the Night." Greek singer Nana Mouskouri also performed a cover version.

References

External links

Cyndi Lauper Official Site (archived 2009)

Cyndi Lauper songs
Epic Records singles
Jules Shear songs
New wave ballads
Song recordings produced by Rick Chertoff
Songs written by Jules Shear
Synth-pop ballads
1980s ballads
1983 songs
1984 singles